Joseph Leonz Andermatt (1740–1817) was a Swiss general.

1740 births
1817 deaths
Swiss generals
Swiss nobility